Coke Studio Bangla is a television series which is the Bangladeshi installment of the Coke Studio franchise which features studio-recorded music performances by established and emerging Bangladeshi artists.

Seasons

Season 1 (2022) 

The series' first season was launched on 7 February 2022, taking inspiration from the success of the Coke Studio franchises in Pakistan and India. The first season ended in 1 September 2022 after airing ten consecutive songs, focused on the folk heritage of Bangladesh.

Season 2 (2023) 

The second season of the series made it's official debut on 14 February 2023, the same day as Valentine's Day and Pahela Falgun, the first day of spring in the Bangladeshi calendar.

See also 
 CloseUp1
 Nescafé Basement
 Wind of Change

References

External links 
 

Bangla
Bangladeshi music television shows
Musical television series
Bangla